Elizabeth Cotton may refer to:

 Elizabeth Cotton, Lady Hope (1842–1922), née Cotton, British evangelist
 Elizabeth Cotten (1893–1987), American singer-songwriter
 Liz Cotton, fictional character in EastEnders